SSW may refer to:

 South-southwest, a compass direction (one of the eight "half-winds")
 SSW (TV station), the callsign of a TV station in the South West and Great Southern regions of Western Australia
 Seminary of the Southwest, an Episcopal seminary in Austin, Texas, USA
 St. Louis Southwestern Railway, reporting mark SSW
 South Schleswig Voter Federation, German: Südschleswigscher Wählerverband
 Schichau Seebeckwerft, a German shipbuilding corporation
 Siemens-Schuckertwerke, a German electrical engineering company
 Special Service Wing, a special forces unit of the Pakistan Air Force
 Sudden stratospheric warming, a meteorological phenomenon in the upper troposphere
 Southern States Wrestling, a professional wrestling promotion
 Swati language ISO 639 code
 Samsung White, former League of Legends team